Sergio Guerrero Romero (born 13 January 1999), sometimes known as Mini, is a Spanish footballer who plays as a midfielder.

Club career
Born in Alameda, Málaga, Andalusia, Guerrero joined Málaga CF's youth setup in 2014, after a brief period at UD Maracena. He made his senior debut with the reserves on 29 October 2017, coming on as a second-half substitute for Pablo Clavería in a 6–1 Tercera División home routing of Guadix CF, and contributed with one further appearance as the side achieved promotion to the Segunda División B.

On 3 October 2018, Guerrero was loaned to fourth division side CD El Palo for the season. He scored his first senior goal on 31 October in a 3–1 home win against Antequera CF, and established himself as a regular starter during his loan spell.

Mini returned to Málaga in July 2019, being again assigned to the B-team. He made his first team – and professional – debut on 8 May 2021, replacing Joaquín Muñoz in a 1–1 away draw against RCD Mallorca in the Segunda División. On 9 July, he moved to another reserve team, Atlético Madrid B of the Tercera División RFEF.

References

External links

1999 births
Living people
Sportspeople from the Province of Málaga
Footballers from Andalusia
Spanish footballers
Association football midfielders
Segunda División players
Tercera División players
Tercera Federación players
Atlético Malagueño players
Málaga CF players
Atlético Madrid B players